The eighty-fourth Minnesota Legislature first convened on January 4, 2005. The 67 members of the Minnesota Senate were elected during the General Election on November 5, 2002, while the 134 members of the Minnesota House of Representatives were elected during the General Election on November 2, 2004.

Sessions 
The legislature met in a regular session from January 4, 2005 to May 23, 2005. It ended without a passage of an overall budget, and a special session was opened May 24, 2005. No overall budget passed by the end of the fiscal year on June 30, and much of the state government shut down for the first time in history, though some essential services remained in operation, and some departments received funding in legislation. On July 9, 2005, a budget was agreed upon, and the special session ended a few days later on July 13, 2005.

A continuation of the regular session was held between March 1, 2006 and May 21, 2006.

Party summary 
Resignations and new members are discussed in the "Membership changes" section, below.

Senate

House of Representatives

Leadership

Senate 
President of the Senate
James Metzen (DFL-South St. Paul)

Senate Majority Leader
Dean Johnson (DFL-Willmar)

Senate Minority Leader
Dick Day (R-Owatonna)

House of Representatives 
Speaker of the House
Steve Sviggum (R-Kenyon)

House Majority Leader
Erik Paulsen (R-Eden Prairie)

House Minority Leader
Matt Entenza (DFL-St. Paul)

Members

Senate

House of Representatives

Membership changes

Senate

House of Representatives

External links 
Senate election results (2002 General Election)
House election results (2004 General Election)

84th
2000s in Minnesota
2005 in Minnesota
2006 in Minnesota
2005 U.S. legislative sessions
2006 U.S. legislative sessions